Baverdan (also Romanized as  Bāverdān, Bāvardān, and Bavardan; also known as Bavirdūn) is a village in Bandar Charak Rural District, Shibkaveh District, Bandar Lengeh County, Hormozgan Province, Iran. At the 2006 census, its population was 140, in 20 families.

References 

Populated places in Bandar Lengeh County